The position of Minister of State at the Department of Energy and Climate Change was a middle-ranking ministerial position in the Government of the United Kingdom. Holders of this office deputised for the Secretary of State for Energy and Climate Change. When the DECC was dissolved in 2016, this office fell out of use.

The portfolio now belongs to the Minister of State for Business, Energy and Clean Growth at the Department for Business, Energy and Industrial Strategy.

Responsibilities
Reference
 Electricity and gas markets
 New energy infrastructure
 Energy security
 Oil and gas policy, including shale gas
 The Nuclear Decommissioning Authority and Geological disposal facility
 New nuclear, Carbon capture and storage (CCS) and renewables
 Nuclear safety and regulation
 International energy

Ministers
Reference
 Andrea Leadsom, 2015-2016
 Matthew Hancock, 2014-2015
 Michael Fallon, 2013-2014
 John Hayes, 2012-2013
 Charles Hendry, 2010 to 2012

See also
 Secretary of State for Energy and Climate Change
 Department of Energy and Climate Change

References

Energy and Climate Change
Department of Energy and Climate Change
2016 disestablishments in the United Kingdom